Basavanagudi Assembly constituency is one of the 224 constituencies in the Karnataka Legislative Assembly of Karnataka a south state of India. Basavanagudi is also part of Bangalore South Lok Sabha constituency.

Members of Legislative Assembly

See also
 Basavanagudi
 Bangalore Urban district
 List of constituencies of Karnataka Legislative Assembly

References

Assembly constituencies of Karnataka
Bangalore Urban district